The William Decker House is located on New Prospect Road in the Town of Shawangunk, New York, United States, at the center of the onetime hamlet of Dwaarkill, on the banks of the creek of the same name. It was built by early settler Garrett Decker in 1730 and later expanded on significantly by William in 1776.

The house was added to the National Register of Historic Places in 1983 (NRHP reference Number 83001815) and recently was joined to a more recently constructed building to serve as the Colonial Inn 1776 restaurant. On March 24, 2008, a fire destroyed the restaurant. The house itself suffered only minimal damage.

References

External links
Sale listing for house and restaurant.

Houses in Ulster County, New York
National Register of Historic Places in Ulster County, New York
Houses completed in 1730
Houses completed in 1776
Shawangunk, New York
1730 establishments in the Thirteen Colonies